Elections to the Preston Municipal Borough Council were held in late 1949.

Results

Preston Municipal Borough Council election
1949
Preston Municipal Borough Council election, 1949